Coal Miner's Daughter is the sixteenth solo studio album by American country music singer-songwriter Loretta Lynn. It was released on January 4, 1971, by Decca Records.

The title song would go on to become Lynn's signature song. The album and song's title would later be used for the name of Lynn's best-selling autobiography as well as the 1980 Oscar-winning movie starring Sissy Spacek. It was also listed at No. 440 on Rolling Stone'''s 2020 ranking of the 500 Greatest Albums of All Time.

Critical reception

In the issue dated January 16, 1971, Billboard published a review of the album that said, "The one and only Loretta Lynn has cut another great package here. The material is done in distinctive style, retaining true country flavor. "Coal Miner's Daughter", "Less of Me", "The Man of the House" are typical. Must merchandise."Cashbox also published a review in their January 16 issue which said, "Loretta Lynn has long been one of  country music's most outstanding and most important female vocalists. She is a writer as well as an interpreter of feelings and emotions. "Coal Miner's Daughter", her most recent top 5 single record is the true story of Loretta and her father, a coal miner in Kentucky. After listening to that cut several times, you can begin to appreciate the sincerity that went into the session with Loretta. Also included in the package are "Hello Darlin'", "Snowbird", "For the Good Times", "What Makes Me Tick", and six other moving selections."Record Worlds review of the album said, "Pretty cover, pretty singing, pretty girl! Contents run like this: "Less of Me", "Anyone, Any Worse, Any Where" are super fine; "For the Good Times" is oversung but she really sinks her teeth into "Man of the House". "Another Man Loved Me Last Night" is ready for everything but airplay and she should have found "Snowbird" first. All in all, it's a good outing but the world needs an all-Loretta penned album."

 Commercial performance 
The album peaked at No. 4 on the US Billboard Hot Country LP's chart and at No. 81 on the US Billboard Top LP's chart. The album was certified Gold by the RIAA in 1983 for shipping 500,000 copies, becoming Lynn's third Gold album.

The album's only single, "Coal Miner's Daughter", was released in October 1970 and peaked at No. 1 on the US Billboard Hot Country Singles chart, and at No. 83 on the US Billboard Hot 100 chart. In Canada, the single peaked at No. 1 on the RPM Country Singles chart.

Recording
Recording sessions for the album took place at Bradley's Barn in Mount Juliet, Tennessee, on April 9, July 14 and 15, and August 19, 1970. Five of the album's eleven tracks were recorded during sessions for previous albums. "Coal Miner's Daughter" had been recorded during the October 1, 1969 session for 1970's Here's Loretta Singing "Wings Upon Your Horns". "It'll Be Open Season on You" was recorded on May 28, 1969, during a session for 1969's Woman of the World/To Make a Man. Three songs were recorded during sessions for 1970's Loretta Lynn Writes 'Em and Sings 'Em. "What Makes Me Tick" was recorded on December 22, 1969, while "Any One, Any Worse, Any Where" and "Another Man Loved Me Last Night" were recorded on December 23, 1969.

 Track listing 

Personnel
Adapted from the album liner notes and Decca recording session records.
Harold Bradley – bass guitar, electric bass guitar
Owen Bradley – producer
Ray Edenton – guitar, acoustic guitar
Buddy Harman – drums
Junior Huskey – bass
Darrell Johnson – mastering
The Jordanaires – background vocals
Loretta Lynn – lead vocals
Grady Martin – guitar, lead electric guitar
Bob Moore – bass
Hargus Robbins – piano
Hal Rugg – steel guitar, dobro
Jerry Stembridge – acoustic guitar
Bobby Thompson – banjo
Pete Wade – guitar
Doyle Wilburn – liner notes
Jim Williamson – engineer

 Charts AlbumSingles'''

Certifications

References 

1971 albums
Loretta Lynn albums
Albums produced by Owen Bradley
Decca Records albums